In mathematics, a bivector is the vector part of a biquaternion. The coordinates w, x, y, z are complex numbers with imaginary unit h: 

A bivector may be written as the sum of real and imaginary parts:

Thus the bivector 

The Lie algebra of the Lorentz group is expressed by bivectors. In particular, if r1 and r2 are right versors so that , then the biquaternion curve  traces over and over the unit circle in the plane  Such a circle corresponds to the space rotation parameters of the Lorentz group.

Now , and the biquaternion curve  is a unit hyperbola in the plane   The spacetime transformations in the Lorentz group that lead to FitzGerald contractions and time dilation depend on a hyperbolic angle parameter. In the words of Ronald Shaw, "Bivectors are logarithms of Lorentz transformations."

The commutator product of this Lie algebra is just twice the cross product on R3, for instance, which is twice .
As Shaw wrote in 1970:
Now it is well known that the Lie algebra of the homogeneous Lorentz group can be considered to be that of bivectors under commutation. [...] The Lie algebra of bivectors is essentially that of complex 3-vectors, with the Lie product being defined to be the familiar cross product in (complex) 3-dimensional space.

William Rowan Hamilton coined both the terms vector and bivector. The first term was named with quaternions, and the second about a decade later, as in Lectures on Quaternions (1853). The popular text Vector Analysis (1901) used the term.

Given a bivector , the ellipse for which r1 and r2 are a pair of conjugate semi-diameters is called the directional ellipse of the bivector r.

In the standard linear representation of biquaternions as 2 × 2 complex matrices acting on the complex plane with basis  
 represents bivector .
The conjugate transpose of this matrix corresponds to −q, so the representation of bivector q is a skew-Hermitian matrix.

Ludwik Silberstein studied a complexified electromagnetic field , where there are three components, each a complex number, known as the Riemann–Silberstein vector.

"Bivectors [...] help describe elliptically polarized homogeneous and inhomogeneous plane waves – one vector for direction of propagation, one for amplitude."

References

 
 
  Link from Cornell University Historical Mathematics Collection.
 

Quaternions
Lie algebras
William Rowan Hamilton